Clemar Bucci (4 September 1920 – 12 January 2011) was a racing driver from Argentina. He participated in five World Championship Formula One Grands Prix, debuting on 17 July 1954 and several non-Championship Formula One races. He scored no championship points. He was born in Zenón Pereyra and died in Buenos Aires.

Complete Formula One World Championship results
(key)

''* Indicates shared drive with Harry Schell and Carlos Menditeguy

References

External links
Clemar Bucci Racing

1920 births
2011 deaths
Argentine racing drivers
Argentine Formula One drivers
Gordini Formula One drivers
Maserati Formula One drivers
Burials at La Chacarita Cemetery
Grand Prix drivers